Rick Nolan is a Minnesota politician.

Richard Nolan may also refer to
Dick Nolan (American football) (1932–2007), American football player, father of Mike Nolan, former head coach of San Francisco 49ers
Dick Nolan (musician) (1939–2005), Canadian singer, songwriter, and guitarist
Richard Thomas Nolan (born 1937), retired Episcopal clergyman, philosophy/religion professor, and author
Richard J. Nolan (1848–1905), Medal of Honor recipient
Richard C. Nolan, American football coach
Richard L. Nolan, American business school professor